The 2024 IFAF World Junior Championship is a scheduled international American football tournament for junior teams (20 years and under). The competition is co-hosted by Football Canada and Football Alberta in Edmonton, Alberta in June and July 2024. Although Football Canada has won the most IFAF World Junior Championships with three, the country has not hosted the event since it started in 2009. 

The final is scheduled for Commonwealth Stadium, home of the Edmonton Football Club of the Canadian Football League.

The only team confirmed for competition is Canada as a host country.

References

External links
 http://www.ifaf.org
 http://www.footballcanada.com

IFAF Junior World Cup
IFAF World Junior Championship
IFAF World Junior Championship
American football in Canada
International sports competitions hosted by Canada
IFAF World Junior Championship
IFAF World Junior Championship